Peter Westbury (26 May 1938 – 7 December 2015) was a British racing driver from England. He participated in two World Championship Formula One Grands Prix, scoring no championship points. In 1969 he raced a Formula 2 Brabham-Cosworth, driving in his first Grand Prix in the 1969 German Grand Prix. He finished ninth on the road, fifth in the F2 class. The following year he failed to qualify for the 1970 United States Grand Prix driving a works BRM, after an engine failure.

Early in his racing career he campaigned a homebuilt special called the M.G.W., graduating to a Cooper-Climax in 1960 which was later fitted with a Daimler V8 engine. Westbury won the British Hill Climb Championship twice, in 1963 and 1964. In 1963 he drove the self-built Felday, with supercharged Daimler V8 2.6-litre motor. The following year he won in the 2.5-litre Climax-engined Ferguson P99 with four-wheel-drive, on loan from Ferguson Research Ltd. Westbury also drove the Ferguson P99 in the 1964 Brighton Speed Trials and at the First International Drag Festival, a series of six events held in England that year, where the car covered the standing-start quarter mile in 11.01 seconds. He also drove a Lotus 23-BRM sports car at the Drag Festival.

During 1965 Westbury developed the Felday-BRM 4 sports car with four-wheel-drive. The car won on its debut at Brands Hatch on Boxing Day, 26 December 1965, driven by Mac Daghorn. At Mallory Park on 13 March 1966, Peter Westbury and Mac Daghorn shared the car, each winning a race. Jim Clark raced the Felday 4 in the Guards Trophy at Brands Hatch on 29 August 1966. The Felday 5 sports car was fitted with a 7-litre Ford Galaxie engine and four wheel drive, but only raced briefly. The Felday 6 was a 4.7-litre Ford-powered hillclimb single-seater, with rear wheel drive, built for Tony Griffiths.

In 1967 Westbury raced a Brabham-Ford Formula Three car in England and in Continental Europe. He won the F3 race at the Silverstone circuit on 29 April, the Grand Prix des Frontières at Chimay on 14 May, and also at the Auvergne Trophy meeting on 18 June 1967, on the daunting Clermont-Ferrand circuit in France. The same year he resuscitated the old BRM P67 four-wheel-drive F1 car, designed by Mike Pilbeam in 1964, for David Good to campaign in the British Hill Climb Championship. The car led the series at the half-way mark, but then passed into the hands of Peter Lawson, who revamped it for 1968. The car was a dominant winner of the series in 1968.

Racing record

Complete British Saloon Car Championship results
(key) (Races in bold indicate pole position; races in italics indicate fastest lap.)

Complete Formula One World Championship results
(key)

References

English racing drivers
British hillclimb drivers
Brighton Speed Trials people
English Formula One drivers
BRM Formula One drivers
European Formula Two Championship drivers
1938 births
2015 deaths
24 Hours of Le Mans drivers
World Sportscar Championship drivers